Mohammed Thambi Hasen Ali (Hasan Ali) is a Sri Lankan politician and a member of the Parliament of Sri Lanka.

In January 2003 Ali was elected secretary general of the Sri Lanka Muslim Congress (SLMC).

Ali was appointed as the SLMC's National List MP in the Sri Lankan Parliament in April 2004. He resigned from Parliament in April 2008 to contest the Eastern Provincial Council elections. He was subsequently elected to EPC from Ampara district but resigned in July 2008. He was then reappointed as SLMC's National List MP.

Ali was appointed a United National Front National List MP in April 2010.

References
 

1945 births
Living people
Alumni of Zahira College, Colombo
Members of the 13th Parliament of Sri Lanka
Members of the 14th Parliament of Sri Lanka
Members of the Eastern Provincial Council
People from Dehiwala-Mount Lavinia
Sri Lanka Muslim Congress politicians
Sri Lankan Moor engineers
Sri Lankan Moor politicians
Sri Lankan Muslims
State ministers of Sri Lanka